Princess Nonglaksana Dhasani ;  complete title: Her Serene Highness Princess  (Mom Chao) Nonglaksana Dhasani Svastivatana) is a Princess of Siam, a member of Siamese royal family and a member House of Svastivatana, a royal house which was originated by her father and descends from Chakri Dynasty and half-sister of Queen Rambhai Barni of Siam.

Reference 

Svastivatana, Nonglaksana Dhasani
Svastivatana, Nonglaksana Dhasani
Nonglaksana Dhasani Svastivatana
Nonglaksana Dhasani Svastivatana
Nonglaksana Dhasani Svastivatana
19th-century Chakri dynasty
20th-century Chakri dynasty